Sounding or soundings may refer to:

Sounding (archaeology), a test dig in archaeology
"Sounding" (Justified), an episode of the TV series Justified
Soundings (journal), an academic journal of leftist political thinking
Soundings (radio drama), science fiction radio drama series produced from 1985 to 1989 in Ottawa
Soundings (Williams), 2003 orchestral composition by John Williams
Soundings (Carter), 2005 orchestral composition by Elliott Carter
Sound (medical instrument), instruments for probing and dilating passages within the body
Urethral sounding, using sounds to increase the inner diameter of the urethra
Depth sounding, a measurement of depth within a body of water
Whale sounding, the act of diving by whales

See also 
Sound (disambiguation)
Sonde (disambiguation)

Sonar, use of sound propagation to navigate, communicate with or detect objects on or under water
Remote sensing, acquisition of information about an object or phenomenon without making physical contact with it
Cone penetration test, a method used to determine the geotechnical engineering properties of soils